Louise is a 2003 animated short by Anita Lebeau, produced by the National Film Board of Canada. The film takes audiences through a day in the life of Lebeau's 96-year-old Belgian-Canadian grandmother, Louise Marginet, who narrates the film. Set in the rural community of Bruxelles, Manitoba, Louise features traditional music played by family as well as the Bruxelles Brass Band.

Louise received 6 awards including the Hiroshima Prize at the Hiroshima International Animation Festival and the Canal J Jury Junior Award for Short Films at the Annecy International Animated Film Festival. The film was also nominated for best animated short at the 25th Genie Awards.

Louise was animated on paper by Lebeau, Jason Doll and John Tanasiciuk, with computer rendering. Lebeau had begun working on the film in 1998, before taking a break to raise her two children. When interviewed at Hiroshima, the filmmaker stated that her grandmother, who had died before the film was completed, was thrilled to have a movie made about her life and family.

References

External links
Watch Louise at NFB.ca

2003 films
Films set in Manitoba
National Film Board of Canada animated short films
Belgian Canadian
Belgian animated films
2000s animated short films
2003 animated films
2003 short films
Films about old age
2000s English-language films
2000s Canadian films